Onolatry is the supposed worship of the donkey. In Imperial Rome, the charge of onolatry was used to taunt the Jews and first Christians. The association of Jews with donkeys was a common feature of Hellenic as well as Latin ethnographic and historical writings, and included accusations of worshipping a golden donkey head and even sacrificing foreigners to it at intervals. A famous example of this is the Alexamenos graffito.

The charge was likely first used against Jews in Egypt, where donkeys were at some points associated with Set, the murderer of Osiris who is in turn destroyed by Isis. It is first attested in the late first century BCE, and was used against Christians extensively in the first and second centuries CE before disappearing almost entirely in the third. The accusation against the Christians is discussed by Tertullian and Minucius Felix, among other early Christian apologists.

Arthur Bernard Cook, in an 1894 article, argued that there had been an ancient Mycenaean cult practising onolatry, citing a fresco depicting donkey-headed figures found near a sacrificial pit and several carved gems apparently showing people wearing donkeys' heads and skins holding sacrificial objects, and further describing the diverse roles asses played in Ancient Greek mythology. His interpretation was challenged at the time by Andrew Lang in Longman's Magazine.

See also
 Alexamenos graffito
 Cultural references to donkeys
 History of early Christianity

References

External links
 Tiberio..., of Zvi Yavetz, on books.google.it

Anti-Christian sentiment in Europe
Donkeys
Animal worship
Set (deity)